Liu Jiahui may refer to:

Liu Jiahui (gymnast) (born 1996), Chinese rhythmic gymnast
Liu Jiahui (footballer) (born 2001), Chinese footballer
Gordon Liu (born 1955), Hong Kong actor